Fritz Walter Paul Friedrichs (28. July 1885, Stützerbach – 1958) (also published as Fritz Friedrichs) was a German chemist.  

Fritz, was a son of Ferdinand and Olga Friedrichs, born Reinhardt. He is the inventor of the spiral cold finger-type condenser, now most commonly known as a Friedrichs condenser, which he described in a 1912 article published in the Journal of the American Chemical Society. Friedrichs was instrumental in the standardization of chemical apparatus in Europe.

References

20th-century German chemists
1885 births
1958 deaths